Brian Leung is an American fiction writer, whose short story collection World Famous Love Acts won the 2005 Asian American Literary Award for fiction and the Mary McCarthy Award in Short Fiction. He has also written three novels.

Personal background 
Leung was born and grew up in San Diego County, California, to a Chinese father who had immigrated to the US and a mother from Battleground, Washington.

He won the Jim Duggins Outstanding Mid-Career Novelists' Prize, presented by the Lambda Literary Awards, in 2012.

Published works 
Leung has written the following books:

 World Famous Love Acts, Sarabande Books, 2004. 
 Lost Men: A Novel, Three Rivers Press, 2007. 
 Take Me Home: A Novel, HarperCollins, 2010. 
 Ivy Vs. Dogg: With A Cast Of Thousands!, C&R Press, 2018 
 All I Should Not Tell, C&R Press, 2021

References

Year of birth missing (living people)
Living people
Indiana University alumni
21st-century American novelists
American novelists of Chinese descent
Writers from California
American male novelists
American gay writers
American LGBT people of Asian descent
American LGBT novelists
American male short story writers
21st-century American short story writers
21st-century American male writers
21st-century LGBT people